The Executive Committee Range is a mountain range consisting of five major volcanoes, which trends north-south for  along the 126th meridian west, in Marie Byrd Land, Antarctica.

The complete range was discovered by the United States Antarctic Service Expedition (1939–41), during a flyover of the area on 15 December 1940, and named for the Executive Committee of the Expedition. Four of the five mountains are named in honor of individual members of the committee;  Mount Sidley, the most imposing mountain in the range and highest volcano in Antarctica, had been discovered and named by Rear Admiral Byrd in 1934, during his privately funded Second Antarctic Expedition. The entire range was mapped in detail, by the United States Geological Survey, using various surveys and U.S. Navy trimetrogon photography performed from 1958 to 1960.

Mountains 
The following are the five mountains, all volcanic in origin, of the Executive Committee Range, in order from south to north.

Mount Waesche

Mount Sidley

Mount Hartigan 
Mount Hartigan is a broad mountain immediately north of Mount Sidley.

The mountain was discovered by the United States Antarctic Service expedition on a flight, Dec. 15, 1940, and named for Rear Admiral Charles C. Hartigan, U.S. Navy (USN), Navy Department member of the Antarctic Service Executive Committee.

Mount Cumming 
Mount Cumming is a low, mostly snow-covered mountain, volcanic in origin, located midway between Mount Hampton and Mount Hartigan.

Discovered by the U.S. Antarctic Service (USAS) (1939–41) on a flight, Dec. 15, 1940, and named for Hugh S. Cumming, Jr., State Department member of the U.S. Antarctic Service (USAS) Executive Committee. Mapped by U.S. Geological Survey (USGS) from surveys and U.S. Navy trimetrogon photography, 1958-60.

Mount Hampton

Other geological features

Peaks
The five mountains have a number of associated subsidiary peaks that have been identified and named.

Le Vaux Peak is a small peak on the east side of the crater rim of Mount Cumming. Mapped by United States Geological Survey (USGS) from surveys and U.S. Navy aerial photographs, 1958-60. Named by Advisory Committee on Antarctic Names (US-ACAN) for Howard A. Le Vaux, auroral physicist at Byrd Station, 1959, and a member of the Marie Byrd Land Traverse Party, 1959-60.

Woolam Peak is a small peak on the southern part of the crater rim of Mount Cumming.

Miscellaneous

Recent and Ongoing Magmatism  

In November 2013, Lough et al. reported deep long period volcanic earthquakes centered at depths of 30-40 km approximately 55 km S of Mount Sidley that were interpreted as indications of present deep crustal magmatic activity beneath the Executive Committee Range.  Ice penetrating radar results reported in this study indicated a sub-ice topographic feature, interpreted as a volcano, above the seismic swarms.  The study also reported a mid-icecap (1400 m depth) ash layer about 8,000 years old that was interpreted as probably originating at nearby Mount Waesche.

References

 
Volcanoes of Marie Byrd Land